Kimberly "Kim" A. Kreiner (born July 26, 1977, in Akron, Ohio) is a female javelin thrower from the United States. Her personal best throw is 64.19 meters, achieved in May 2007 in Fortaleza.

She finished fifth at the 2001 Universiade, won the 2003 Pan American Games and finished eighth at the 2006 World Cup. She also competed at the World Championships in 2003 and 2005 as well as the Olympic Games in 2004 and 2008 without reaching the final.

She is a four time National Champion, winning in 2001 and 2004–2006.  She held the American record from 2002 until 2010.  In 2004, she won the U.S. Olympic Trials.

International competitions

References

External links
 
 

1977 births
Living people
Sportspeople from Akron, Ohio
Track and field athletes from California
American female javelin throwers
Olympic track and field athletes of the United States
Athletes (track and field) at the 2004 Summer Olympics
Athletes (track and field) at the 2008 Summer Olympics
Pan American Games medalists in athletics (track and field)
Pan American Games gold medalists for the United States
Athletes (track and field) at the 2003 Pan American Games
World Athletics Championships athletes for the United States
Kent State Golden Flashes women's track and field athletes
People from Mogadore, Ohio
Competitors at the 2001 Summer Universiade
Medalists at the 2003 Pan American Games